Avian influenza, known informally as avian flu, is a bird flu caused by the influenza A virus, which can infect people.  It is similar to other types of animal flu in that it is caused by a virus strain that has adapted to a specific host. The type with the greatest risk is highly pathogenic avian influenza (HPAI).   

Though influenza A is adapted to birds, it can also stably adapt and sustain person-to-person transmission. Recent influenza research into the genes of the Spanish flu virus shows it to have genes adapted from both human and avian strains. Pigs can also be infected with human, avian, and swine influenza viruses, allowing for mixtures of genes (reassortment) to create a new virus, which can cause an antigenic shift to a new influenza A virus subtype which most people have little to no immune protection against.

Avian influenza strains are divided into two types based on their pathogenicity: high pathogenicity (HP) or low pathogenicity (LP). The most well-known HPAI strain, H5N1, was first isolated from a farmed goose in Guangdong Province, China in 1996, and also has low pathogenic strains found in North America. Companion birds in captivity are unlikely to contract the virus and there has been no report of a companion bird with avian influenza since 2003. Pigeons can contract avian strains, but rarely become ill and are incapable of transmitting the virus efficiently to humans or other animals.

History 
The type of influenza known informally as avian or bird flu is caused by viruses adapted to birds. The most widely quoted date for the beginning of recorded history of avian influenza (initially known as fowl plague) was in 1878 when it was differentiated from other diseases that caused high mortality rates in birds. Fowl plague or Avian Flu also included Newcastle disease until as recently as the 1950s. Between 1959 and 1995, there were 15 recorded occasions of the emergence of HPAI viruses in poultry, but losses were minimal. Between 1996 and 2008, HPAI outbreaks in poultry have occurred at least 11 times and 4 of these outbreaks have involved millions of birds.

In the 1990s, the world's poultry population grew 76% in developing countries and 23% in developed countries, contributing to the increased prevalence of avian influenza. Before the 1990s, HPAI caused high mortality in poultry, but infections were sporadic and contained. Outbreaks have become more common due to the high density and frequent movement of flocks from intensive poultry production.

Influenza A/H5N1 was first isolated from a goose in China in 1996. Human infections were first reported in 1997 in Hong Kong. Since 2003, more than 700 human cases of Asian HPAI H5N1 have been reported to the WHO, primarily from 15 countries in Asia, Africa, the Pacific, Europe, and the Middle East, though over 60 countries have been affected.

Between early 2013 and early 2017, 916 lab-confirmed human cases of H7N9 were reported to the World Health Organization (WHO). On 9 January 2017, the National Health and Family Planning Commission of China reported to the WHO 106 cases of H7N9 which occurred from late November through late December, including 35 deaths, 2 potential cases of human-to-human transmission, and 80 of these 106 persons stating that they have visited live poultry markets. The cases are reported from Jiangsu (52), Zhejiang (21), Anhui (14), Guangdong (14), Shanghai (2), Fujian (2) and Hunan (1). Similar sudden increases in the number of human cases of H7N9 have occurred in previous years during December and January.

United States 2014–15 outbreak
From 2014 through 2015, United States poultry and egg producers experienced the largest outbreak of H5N2 in recorded history with approximately 51 million birds depopulated to control the spread of the disease. From May to June 2015, 25 million birds were culled, equating to 409,836 birds per day, or 284 birds per minute. In total, the 2014-2015 H5N2/H5N8 outbreak cost US$879 million in public expenditures and the United States egg and poultry industry more than US$3 billion to eradicate the disease from poultry production. This was the most costly United States HPAI outbreak to date.

2020 

By the end of 2020, several outbreaks of various bird flus were reported in Europe. Since mid-October several European countries, including Belgium, Denmark, France, Germany, Ireland, the Netherlands, Sweden, and the United Kingdom have reported outbreaks of highly pathogenic avian influenza (HPAI) viruses, mostly in wild birds. Positive tests were also among poultry and captive birds. According to a report by the European Centre for Disease Prevention and Control (ECDC), three varieties of HPAI viruses were found, A(H5N8), A(H5N5) and A(H5N1), with H5N8 being the most commonly found. In Germany, 29,000 chickens were killed to halt the spread of H5N8. In Belgium, H5N5 was found on a poultry farm according to the World Organization for Animal Health (OIE). The outbreak was reported in Menen, near the border with France, and killed 600 birds and the culling of an additional 151,000 chickens from the flock.

United States 2022–23 outbreak 
Since early 2022, more than 58 million birds in 47 states have died either directly from a bird flu virus infection or been culled (killed) as a result of possible exposure to infected birds. The recent strain has cost the government $661 million with no end to the outbreak in sight despite severe mitigation measures put in place by the industry after the 2015 outbreak.
Iowa, the biggest egg producer in the United States, has been the most affected, with almost 16 million birds slaughtered.

In January 2023, in Tijuana, a dozen eggs were priced at about $2.30, yet $7.37 in California, and border crossers who declare the eggs at the inspection stations are told the items aren’t allowed and must be turned over.

Genetics
Genetic factors in distinguishing between "human flu viruses" and "avian flu viruses" include:
PB2 (RNA polymerase) Amino acid (or residue) position 627 in the PB2 protein encoded by the PB2 RNA gene. Until H5N1, all known avian influenza viruses had a Glu at position 627, while all human influenza viruses had a Lys.
HA (hemagglutinin) Avian influenza HA viruses bind alpha 2-3 sialic acid receptors, while human influenza HA viruses bind alpha 2-6 sialic acid receptors. Swine influenza viruses have the ability to bind both types of sialic acid receptors. Hemagglutinin is the major antigen of the virus against which neutralizing antibodies are produced, and influenza virus epidemics are associated with changes in its antigenic structure. This was originally derived from pigs, and should technically be referred to as "pig flu".

The evolution of avian influenza virus has been influenced by genetic variation in the virus population due to genome segment reassortment and mutation. Also homologous recombination occurs in viral genes, suggesting that genetic variation generated by homologous recombination has also played a role in driving the evolution of the virus and potentially has affected virulence and host range.

Subtypes
Out of the three types of influenza viruses (A, B, and C), influenza A virus can cause zoonotic infections, with a natural reservoir almost entirely in birds. There are many subtypes of avian influenza viruses, but only some strains of five subtypes have been known to infect humans: H5N1, H7N3, H7N7, H7N9, and H9N2. At least one person, an elderly woman in Jiangxi Province, China, died of pneumonia in December 2013 from the H10N8 strain. She was the first human fatality confirmed to be caused by that strain.

Most human cases of the avian flu are a result of either handling dead infected birds or from contact with infected fluids. It can also be spread through contaminated surfaces and droppings. While most wild birds have only a mild form of the H5N1 strain, once domesticated birds such as chickens or turkeys are infected, H5N1 can potentially become much more deadly because the birds are often in close contact. H5N1 is a large threat in Asia with infected poultry due to low hygiene conditions and close quarters. Although it is easy for humans to contract the infection from birds, human-to-human transmission is more difficult without prolonged contact. Public health officials believe strains of avian flu may mutate to become easily transmissible between humans.

Spreading of H5N1 from Asia to Europe is much more likely caused by both legal and illegal poultry trades than dispersing through wild bird migrations, being that in recent studies, there were no secondary rises in infection in Asia when wild birds migrate south again from their breeding grounds. Instead, the infection patterns followed transportation such as railroads, roads, and country borders, suggesting poultry trade as being much more likely. While there have been strains of avian flu to exist in the United States, they have been extinguished and have not been known to infect humans.

Examples of avian influenza A virus strains:

Transmission 

Avian influenza is most often spread by contact between infected and healthy birds, though can also be spread indirectly through contaminated equipment. The virus is found in secretions from the nostrils, mouth, and eyes of infected birds as well as their droppings. HPAI infection is spread to people often through direct contact with infected poultry, such as during slaughter or plucking. Though the virus can spread through airborne secretions, the disease itself is not an airborne disease. Highly pathogenic strains spread quickly among flocks and can destroy a flock within 28 hours; the less pathogenic strains may affect egg production but are much less deadly.

Although it is possible for humans to contract the avian influenza virus from birds, human-to-human contact is much more difficult without prolonged contact. Public health officials believe strains of avian flu may mutate to become easily transmissible between humans. Some strains of avian influenza are present in the intestinal tract of large numbers of shore birds and water birds, but these strains rarely cause human infection.

Five manmade ecosystems have contributed to modern avian influenza virus ecology: integrated indoor commercial poultry, range-raised commercial poultry, live poultry markets, backyard and hobby flocks, and bird collection and trading systems including cockfighting. Indoor commercial poultry has had the largest impact on the spread of HPAI, with the increase in HPAI outbreaks largely the result of increased commercial production since the 1990s.

In the early days of the HPAI H5N1 pandemic, village poultry and their owners were frequently implicated in disease transmission. Village poultry, also known as backyard and hobby flocks, are small flocks raised under extensive conditions and often allowed free range between multiple households. Further research suggested these flocks pose less of a threat than intensively raised commercial poultry with homogenous genetic stock and poor biosecurity. Backyard and village poultry also do not travel great distances compared to transport of intensively raised poultry and contribute less to the spread of HPAI.

H5N1

The highly pathogenic influenza A virus subtype H5N1 is an emerging avian influenza virus that is causing global concern as a potential pandemic threat. It is often referred to simply as "bird flu" or "avian influenza", even though it is only one of many subtypes.

H5N1 has killed millions of poultry in a growing number of countries throughout Asia, Europe, and Africa. Health experts are concerned that the coexistence of human flu viruses and avian flu viruses (especially H5N1) will provide an opportunity for genetic material to be exchanged between species-specific viruses, possibly creating a new virulent influenza strain that is easily transmissible and lethal to humans. The mortality rate for humans with H5N1 is 60%.

Since the first human H5N1 outbreak occurred in 1997, there has been an increasing number of HPAI H5N1 bird-to-human transmissions, leading to clinically severe and fatal human infections. Because a significant species barrier exists between birds and humans, the virus does not easily spread to humans. Some cases of infection were researched to discern whether human-to-human transmission occurred. More research is necessary to understand the pathogenesis and epidemiology of the H5N1 virus in humans. Exposure routes and other disease transmission characteristics, such as genetic and immunological factors that may increase the likelihood of infection, are not clearly understood.

The first known transmission of H5N1 to a human occurred in Hong Kong in 1997, when there was an outbreak of 18 human cases; 6 deaths were confirmed. None of the infected people worked with poultry. After culling all of the poultry in the area, no more cases were diagnosed. In 2006, the first human-to-human transmission likely occurred when seven members of a family in Sumatra became infected after contact with a family member who had worked with infected poultry.

Although millions of birds have become infected with the virus since its discovery, 359 people have died from H5N1 in twelve countries according to World Health Organization reports as of August 10, 2012.

The H5N1 outbreak in Thailand caused massive economic losses, especially among poultry workers. Infected birds were culled and slaughtered. The public lost confidence with the poultry products, thus decreasing the consumption of chicken products. This also elicited a ban from importing countries. Several factors enhanced the virality, including bird migration, cool temperature (increases virus survival) and several festivals at that time.

A mutation in the virus was discovered in two Guangdong patients in February 2017 which rendered it more deadly to chickens, inasmuch as it could infect every organ; the risk to humans was not increased.

Research
A study published in 2012 in Science Magazine reported on research findings that allowed for the airborne transmission of H5N1 in laboratory ferrets. The study in question created airborne H5N1 via amino acid substitutions that largely mitigated the devastating effects of the disease. This fact was underscored by the 0% fatality rate among the ferrets infected via airborne transmission, as well as the fundamental biology underlying the substitutions. Flu viruses attach to host cells via the hemagluttinin proteins on their envelope. These hemagluttinin proteins bind to sialic acid receptors on host cells, which can fall into two categories. The sialic acid receptors can be either 2,3 or 2,6-linked, with the species of origin largely deciding receptor preference. In influenzas of avian origin 2,3-linkage is preferred, vs. influenzas of human origin in which 2,6-linkage is preferable. 2,3-linked SA receptors in humans are found predominantly in the lower respiratory tract, a fact that is the primary foundation for the deadliness of avian influenzas in humans, and also the key to their lack of airborne transmission. In the study that created an airborne avian influenza among ferrets it was necessary to switch the receptor preference of the host cells to those of 2,6-linkage, found predominantly in humans' upper respiratory tract, in order to create an infection that could shed aerosolized virus particles. Such an infection must occur in the upper respiratory tract of humans, thus fundamentally undercutting the fatal trajectory of the disease.

H7N9

Influenza A virus subtype H7N9 is a novel avian influenza virus first reported to have infected humans in 2013 in China. Most of the reported cases of human infection have resulted in severe respiratory illness. In the month following the report of the first case, more than 100 people had been infected, an unusually high rate for a new infection; a fifth of those patients had died, a fifth had recovered, and the rest remained critically ill. The WHO has identified H7N9 as "...an unusually dangerous virus for humans." As of June 30, 133 cases have been reported, resulting in the deaths of 43.

Research regarding background and transmission is ongoing. It has been established that many of the human cases of H7N9 appear to have a link to live bird markets. As of July 2013, there is no evidence of sustained human-to-human transmission. A study group headed by one of the world's leading experts on avian flu reported that several instances of human-to-human infection were suspected.
It has been reported that H7N9 virus does not kill poultry, which will make surveillance much more difficult. Researchers have commented on the unusual prevalence of older males among H7N9-infected patients. While several environmental, behavioral, and biological explanations for this pattern have been proposed, as yet, the reason is unknown. Currently no vaccine exists, but the use of influenza antiviral drugs known as neuraminidase inhibitors in cases of early infection may be effective.

The number of cases detected after April fell abruptly. The decrease in the number of new human H7N9 cases may have resulted from containment measures taken by Chinese authorities, including closing live bird markets, or from a change in seasons, or possibly a combination of both factors. Studies indicate that avian influenza viruses have a seasonal pattern, thus it is thought that infections may pick up again when the weather turns cooler in China.

In the four years from early 2013 to early 2017, 916 lab-confirmed human cases of H7N9 were reported to the WHO.

On 9 January 2017, the National Health and Family Planning Commission of China reported to the WHO 106 cases which occurred from late November through December. 29, 2016. The cases are reported from Jiangsu (52), Zhejiang (21), Anhui (14), Guangdong (14), Shanghai (2), Fujian (2) and Hunan (1). 80 of these 106 persons have visited live poultry markets. Of these cases, there have been 35 deaths. In two of the 106 cases, human-to-human transmission could not be ruled out.

Affected prefectures in Jiangsu province closed live poultry markets in late December 2016, whereas Zhejiang, Guangdong and Anhui provinces went the route of strengthening live poultry market regulations. Travellers to affected regions are recommended to avoid poultry farms, live bird markets, and surfaces which appear to be contaminated with poultry feces. Similar sudden increases in the number of human cases of H7N9 have occurred in previous years during December and January.

Domestic animals

Several domestic species have been infected with and shown symptoms of H5N1 viral infection, including cats, dogs, ferrets, pigs, and birds.

Birds

Attempts are made in the United States to minimize the presence of HPAI in poultry through routine surveillance of poultry flocks in commercial poultry operations. Detection of a HPAI virus may result in immediate culling of the flock. Less pathogenic viruses are controlled by vaccination, which is done primarily in turkey flocks (ATCvet codes:  for the inactivated fowl vaccine,  for the inactivated turkey combination vaccine).

Cats
Avian influenza in cats can show a variety of symptoms and usually lead to death. Cats are able to get infected by either consuming an infected bird or by contracting the virus from another infected cat.

Global impact 
In 2005, the formation of the International Partnership on Avian and Pandemic Influenza was announced in order to elevate the importance of avian flu, coordinate efforts, and improve disease reporting and surveillance in order to better respond to future pandemics. New networks of laboratories have emerged to detect and respond to avian flu, such as the Crisis Management Center for Animal Health, the Global Avian Influenza Network for Surveillance, OFFLU, and the Global Early Warning System for major animal diseases. After the 2003 outbreak, WHO member states have also recognized the need for more transparent and equitable sharing of vaccines and other benefits from these networks. Cooperative measures created in response to HPAI have served as a basis for programs related to other emerging and re-emerging infectious diseases.

HPAI control has also been used for political ends. In Indonesia, negotiations with global response networks were used to recentralize power and funding to the Ministry of Health. In Vietnam policymakers, with the support of the Food and Agriculture Organization of the United Nations (FAO), used HPAI control to accelerate the industrialization of livestock production for export by proposing to increase the portion of large-scale commercial farms and reducing the number of poultry keepers from 8 to 2 million by 2010.

Stigma 
Backyard poultry production was viewed as "traditional Asian" agricultural practices that contrasted with modern commercial poultry production and seen as a threat to biosecurity. Backyard production appeared to hold greater risk than commercial production due to lack of biosecurity and close contact with humans, though HPAI spread in intensively raised flocks was greater due to high density rearing and genetic homogeneity. Asian culture itself was blamed as the reason why certain interventions, such as those that only looked at placed-based interventions, would fail without looking for multifaceted solutions.

Indonesia 
Press accounts of avian flu in Indonesia were seen by poultry farmers as conflating suspected cases while the public did see the accounts as informative, though many became de-sensitized to the idea of impending danger or only temporarily changed their poultry-related behavior. Rumors also circulated in Java in 2006. These tended to focus on bird flu being linked to big businesses in order to drive small farmers out of the market by exaggerating the danger of avian influenza, avian flu being introduced by foreigners to force Indonesians to purchase imported chicken and keep Indonesian chicken off the world market, and the government using avian flu as a ploy to attract funds from wealthy countries. Such rumors reflected concerns about big businesses, globalization, and a distrust of the national government in a country where "the amount of decentralization here is breathtaking" according to Steven Bjorge, a WHO epidemiologist in Jakarta in 2006.

In the context a decentralized national government that the public did not completely trust, Indonesian Health Minister Siti Fadilah Supari announced in December 2006 that her government would no longer be sharing samples of H5N1 collected from Indonesian patients. This decision came as a shock to the international community as it disrupted the Global Influenza Surveillance Network (GISN) coordinated by the WHO for managing seasonal and pandemic influenza. GISN is based on countries sharing virus specimens freely with the WHO which assesses and eventually sends these samples to pharmaceutical companies in order to produce vaccines that are sold back to these countries. Though this was initially seen as an attempt to protect national sovereignty at all costs, it was instead used for a domestic political struggle. Prior to Indonesia's dispute with the GISN, the Ministry of Health, already weak due to the decentralized nature the government, was experiencing further leakage of funding to state and non-state agencies due to global health interventions. By reasserting control over public health issues and funding by setting itself up as the sole Indonesian representative to the WHO, the Ministry of Health made itself a key player in the management of future international funds relating vaccine production and renegotiated benefits from global surveillance networks.

Economic 
Approximately 20% of the protein consumed in developing countries come from poultry. In the wake of the H5N1 pandemic, millions of poultry were killed. In Vietnam alone, over 50 million domestic birds were killed due to HPAI infection and control attempts. A 2005 report by the FAO totaled economic losses in South East Asia around US$10 billion. This had the greatest impact on small scale commercial and backyard producers relative to total assets compared to industrial chains which primarily experience temporary decreases in exports and loss of consumer confidence. Some governments did provide compensation for culled poultry, it was often far below market value (close to 30% of market value in Vietnam), while others such as Cambodia provide no compensation to farmers at all.

As poultry serves as a source of food security and liquid assets, the most vulnerable populations were poor small scale farmers. The loss of birds due to HPAI and culling in Vietnam led to an average loss of 2.3 months of production and US$69–108 for households where many have an income of $2 a day or less. The loss of food security for vulnerable households can be seen in the stunting of children under five in Egypt. Women are another population at risk as in most regions of the world, small flocks are tended to by women. Widespread culling also resulted in the decreased enrollment of girls in school in Turkey.

Prevention

People who do not regularly come into contact with birds are not at high risk for contracting avian influenza. Those at high risk include poultry farm workers, animal control workers, wildlife biologists, and ornithologists who handle live birds. Organizations with high-risk workers should have an avian influenza response plan in place before any cases have been discovered. Biosecurity of poultry flocks is also important for prevention. Flocks should be isolated from outside birds, especially wild birds, and their waste; vehicles used around the flock should be regularly disinfected and not shared between farms; and birds from slaughter channels should not be returned to the farm.

With proper infection control and use of personal protective equipment (PPE), the chance for infection is low. Protecting the eyes, nose, mouth, and hands is important for prevention because these are the most common ways for the virus to enter the body. Appropriate personal protective equipment includes aprons or coveralls, gloves, boots or boot covers, and a head cover or hair cover. Disposable PPE is recommended. An N-95 respirator and unvented/indirectly vented safety goggles are also part of appropriate PPE. A powered air purifying respirator (PAPR) with hood or helmet and face shield is also an option.

Proper reporting of an isolated case can help to prevent spread. The Centers for Disease Control and Prevention (US) recommendation is that if a worker develops symptoms within 10 days of working with infected poultry or potentially contaminated materials, they should seek care and notify their employer, who should notify public health officials.

For future avian influenza threats, the WHO suggests a three-phase, five-part plan.
 Phase 1: Pre-pandemic
 Reduce opportunities for human infection
 Strengthen the early warning system
 Phase 2: Emergence of a pandemic virus
 Contain or delay spread at the source
 Phase 3: Pandemic declared and spreading internationally
 Reduce morbidity, mortality, and social disruption
 Conduct research to guide response measures
Vaccines for poultry have been formulated against several of the avian H5N1 influenza varieties. Control measures for HPAI encourage mass vaccinations of poultry though The World Health Organization has compiled a list of known clinical trials of pandemic influenza prototype vaccines, including those against H5N1. In some countries still at high risk for HPAI spread, there is compulsory strategic vaccination though vaccine supply shortages remain a problem.

For village poultry farmers 
During the initial response to H5N1, a one size fits all recommendation was used for all poultry production systems, though measures for intensively raised birds were not necessarily appropriate for extensively raised birds. When looking at village-raised poultry, it was first assumed that the household was the unit and that flocks did not make contact with other flocks, though more effective measures came into use when the epidemiological unit was the village.

Recommendations involve restructuring commercial markets to improve biosecurity against avian influenza. Poultry production zoning is used to limit poultry farming to specific areas outside of urban environments while live poultry markets improve biosecurity by limiting the number of traders holding licenses and subjecting producers and traders to more stringent inspections. These recommendations in combination with requirements to fence and house all poultry, and to limit free ranging flocks, will eventually lead to fewer small commercial producers and backyard producers, costing livelihoods as they are unable to meet the conditions needed to participate.

A summary of reports to the World Organisation for Animal Health in 2005 and 2010 suggest that surveillance and under-reporting in developed and developing countries is still a challenge. Often, donor support can focus on HPAI control alone, while similar diseases such as Newcastle disease, acute fowl cholera, infectious laryngotracheitis, and infectious bursal disease still affect poultry populations. When HPAI tests come back negative, a lack of funded testing for differential diagnoses can leave farmers wondering what killed their birds.

Since traditional production systems require little investment and serve as a safety net for lower income households, prevention and treatment can be seen as less cost-effective than letting poultry die. Effective control not only requires prior agreements to be made with relevant government agencies, such as seen with Indonesia, they must also not unduly threaten food security.

Culling 

Culling is used in order to decrease the threat of avian influenza transmission by killing potentially infected birds. The FAO manual on HPAI control recommends a zoning strategy which begins with the identification of an infected area (IA) where sick or dead birds have tested positive. All poultry in this zone are culled while the area 1 to 5 km from the outer boundary of the IA is considered the restricted area (RA) placed under strict surveillance. 2 to 10 km from the RA is the control area (CA) that serves as a buffer zone in case of spread. Culling is not recommended beyond the IA unless there is evidence of spread. The manual also provides examples of how control was carried out between 2004 and 2005 to contain H5N1 where all poultry was to be stamped out in a 3 km radius beyond the infected point and beyond that a 5 km radius where all fowl was to be vaccinated. This culling method was indiscriminate as a large proportion of the poultry inside these areas were small backyard flocks which did not travel great enough distances to carry infection to adjacent villages without human effort and may have not been infected at all. Between 2004 and 2005, over 100 million chickens were culled in Asia to contain H5N1.

The risk of mass culling of birds and the resulting economic impact led to farmers who were reluctant to report sick poultry. The culls often preempted actual lab testing for H5N1 as avian flu policy justified sacrificing poultry as a safeguard against HPAI spread. In response to these policies, farmers in Vietnam between 2003 and 2004 became more and more unwilling to surrender apparently healthy birds to authorities and stole poultry destined for culls as it stripped poultry of their biosocial and economic worth. By the end of 2005, the government implemented a new policy that targeted high-risk flock in the immediate vicinity of infected farms and instituted voluntary culling with compensation in the case of a local outbreak.

Not only did culling result in severe economic impacts especially for small scale farmers, culling itself may be an ineffective preventative measure. In the short-term, mass culling achieves its goals of limiting the immediate spread of HPAI, it has been found to impede the evolution of host resistance which is important for the long-term success of HPAI control. Mass culling also selects for elevated influenza virulence and results in the greater mortality of birds overall. Effective culling strategies must be selective as well as considerate of economic impacts to optimize epidemiological control and minimize economic and agricultural destruction.

People-poultry relations 
Prevention and control programs must take into account local understandings of people-poultry relations. In the past, programs that have focused on singular, place-based understandings of disease transmission have been ineffective. In the case of Northern Vietnam, health workers saw poultry as commodities with an environment that was under the control of people. Poultry existed in the context of farms, markets, slaughterhouses, and roads while humans were indirectly the primary transmitters of avian flu, placing the burden of disease control on people. Farmers saw their free ranging poultry in an environment dominated by nonhuman forces that they could not exert control over. There were a host of nonhuman actors such as wild birds and weather patterns whose relationships with the poultry fostered the disease and absolved farmers of complete responsibility for disease control.

Attempts at singular, place-based controls sought to teach farmers to identify areas where their behavior could change without looking at poultry behaviors. Behavior recommendations by Vietnam's National Steering Committee for Avian Influenza Control and Prevention (NSCAI) were drawn from the FAO Principles of Biosecurity. These included restrictions from entering areas where poultry are kept by erecting barriers to segregate poultry from non-human contact, limits on human movement of poultry and poultry-related products ideally to transporters, and recommendations for farmers to wash hands and footwear before and after contact with poultry. Farmers, pointed to wind and environmental pollution as reasons poultry would get sick. NSCAI recommendations also would disrupt longstanding livestock production practices as gates impede sales by restricting assessment of birds by appearance and offend customers by limiting outside human contact. Instead of incorporating local knowledge into recommendations, cultural barriers were used as scapegoats for failed interventions. Prevention and control methods have been more effective when also considering the social, political, and ecological agents in play.

See also

 H7N9
 Global spread of H5N1
 H5N1
 Health crisis
 Influenza
 Influenza A virus
 Influenza pandemic
 Influenza Genome Sequencing Project
 Influenza research
 Influenza vaccine
 International Partnership on Avian and Pandemic Influenza
 OIE/FAO Network of Expertise on Animal Influenza
 Pandemic Preparedness and Response Act
 Subtypes of Influenza A virus
 Transmission and infection of H5N1

Notes

References

Sources
 Orent, Wendy (2006) The Science of Avian Flu, Answers to Nine Frequently Asked Questions (Discover Magazine. Health & Medicine. February 20, 2006. 59–61)
 Haugan, Salomon   (2012) Avian Influenza: Etiology, Pathogenesis and Interventions (Nova Science Publishers, Inc.) 
 Riley M. Seeger, Amy D. Hagerman, Kamina K. Johnson, Dustin L. Pendell, Thomas L. Marsh (2021)When poultry take a sick leave: Response costs for the 2014–2015 highly pathogenic avian influenza epidemic in the USA (Food Policy, 2021, 102068.)

External links

World Health Organisation (WHO)
WHO Avian influenza resource
The United Nation's World Health Organization's Avian Flu Facts Sheet for 2006
In-depth analysis of bird flu Symptoms & in-depth analysis on avian flu

Food and Agriculture Organization of the UN (FAO)
FAO Avian Influenza portal Information resources, animations, videos, photos
FAO Bird Flu disease card 

World Organisation for Animal Health (OIE)
Current status of HPAI worldwide at OIE. WAHID Interface – OIE World Animal Health Information Database
Disease card
 Avian influenza resource By Dr. Nati Elkin – Atlases, vaccines and information.

United States
 PandemicFlu.Gov U.S. Government avian and pandemic flu information
 CIDRAP Avian Flu Overview "Avian Influenza (Bird Flu): Agricultural and Wildlife Considerations"
 US Avian Influenza Response U.S. Agency for International Development (USAID)
 Avian influenza research and recommendations National Institute for Occupational Safety and Health
 Influenza Research Database Database of influenza sequences and related information.
 Species Profile- Avian Influenza (Orthomyxoviridae Influenza Type A, subtype H5N1), National Invasive Species Information Center, United States National Agricultural Library. Lists general information and resources for Avian Influenza.
 Strategic Health Communication for Avian and Pandemic Influenza Prevention Johns Hopkins Bloomberg School of Public Health Center for Communication Programs Global Program on Avian and Pandemic Influenza.
 NIOSH Alert: Protecting Poultry Workers from Avian Influenza (Bird Flu) CDC/NIOSH recommendations for poultry workers

Europe
 European Commission Avian Influenza control measures
 Avian Influenza: Questions & Answers European Centre for Disease Prevention and Control – Official website
 FluTrop: Avian Influenza Research in Tropical Countries French Agricultural Research Center for Developing Countries (CIRAD), Avian Influenza website

 
Bird diseases
Poultry diseases
Agricultural health and safety